Wrzosy may refer to the following places in Poland:
Wrzosy, Lower Silesian Voivodeship (south-west Poland)
Wrzosy, Kuyavian-Pomeranian Voivodeship (north-central Poland)
Wrzosy, Łódź Voivodeship (central Poland)
Wrzosy, Lesser Poland Voivodeship (south Poland)
Wrzosy, Greater Poland Voivodeship (west-central Poland)
Wrzosy, Gliwice County in Silesian Voivodeship (south Poland)
Wrzosy, Gmina Popów in Silesian Voivodeship (south Poland)
Wrzosy, Gmina Przystajń in Silesian Voivodeship (south Poland)
Wrzosy, West Pomeranian Voivodeship (north-west Poland)